Van Gelder's bat or Van Gelder's big-eared bat (Bauerus dubiaquercus) is a species of vesper bat in the family Vespertilionidae. It is found in Belize, Costa Rica, Honduras, and Mexico. The species is monotypic within its genus. It is part of the tribe Antrozoini within the subfamily Vespertilioninae and is related to the pallid bat (Antrozous pallidus). The bat is found in forest habitat from sea level to elevations as high as 2300 m, although not usually above 1300 m, and is insectivorous and crepuscular. It apparently has a fragmented distribution, and is threatened by deforestation.

Taxonomy and etymology
The bat was discovered by Richard Van Gelder, then curator of mammalogy at the American Museum of Natural History.  The bat was collected on the AMNH Puritan Expedition to Baja California in 1957 on the Tres Maria Islands (south of Baja) by Richard Zweifel (expedition herpetologist) and Oakes Plimpton (expedition assistant).  Van Gelder dubbed the bat "dubiaquercus" in honor of the collectors: dubia means "doubt" in Latin, as zweifel does in German; quercus is Latin for "oak".

Range and habitat
Van Gelder's bat is found in Central America where its range includes Belize, Costa Rica, El Salvador, Guatemala, Honduras, Mexico, and Nicaragua.

Conservation
As of 2018, it is evaluated as a near-threatened species by the IUCN.
It meets the criteria for this classification because it is locally uncommon throughout its range; it is experiencing significant population declines; and its habitats are "highly fragile".

References 

Vesper bats
Bats of Central America
Bats of Mexico
Near threatened biota of Mexico
Near threatened fauna of North America
Mammals described in 1959
Taxonomy articles created by Polbot
Fauna of the Southern Pacific dry forests
Petén–Veracruz moist forests